The Health insurance premium index collects data on the evolution of premiums for compulsory and complementary health insurance and is the weighted average of the two sub-indices. By means of the Health insurance premium index, the effects of the evolution of premiums on the growth of households' disposable income can be calculated.

In Switzerland, the Health insurance premium index is compiled by the Federal Social Insurance Office (for the basic health insurance) and by the Federal Statistical Office (for the field of supplementary insurances).

Legal basis 
The legal basis of the Health Insurance Premium Index is the Federal Statistics Act of 9 October 1992 (BStatG) and the Ordinance of 30 June 1993 on the Conduct of Statistical Surveys by the Confederation.

Type of survey 
The Health insurance premium index is calculated based on an online (email) sample survey. For the basic health insurance a full survey is conducted and for the supplementary insurance the biggest providers, which account for about 70% of the total market, are surveyed. Participation in the survey is compulsory.

Features registered 
The survey covers health insurance premiums for the basic and supplementary insurance areas. The annual premium for new basic insurance policies and the supplementary hospital insurances are covered by canton and age category.

Period conducted 
The Health insurance premium index has been compiled every year from October to November since 1999.

Footnotes and references 
 Federal Statistical Office (FSO), Health Insurance Premium Index, Factsheet (German)

External links 
 Federal Statistical Office (FSO), Health Insurance Premium Index (German)

Health insurance
Healthcare in Switzerland